Pickford is a surname, and may refer to

 Sir Alfred "Pickle" Pickford, Scouting luminary and friend of Lord Baden-Powell
 Charlotte Hennessy, aka Charlotte Smith Pickford, Canadian-American actress, mother of Mary, Lottie, and Jack Pickford
 Catherine Pickford (born 1976), English Anglican priest
 Grace Evelyn Pickford, American biologist
 Henry Pickford (1820–unknown), English cricketer 
 Jack Pickford, Canadian-American actor, brother of Mary Pickford
 James Pickford (born 1979), British race car driver
 Jordan Pickford (born 1994), English footballer
 Joseph Pickford, British architect
 Kevin Pickford, retired Major League Baseball pitcher
 Lottie Pickford, Canadian-American actress, sister of Mary Pickford
 Martin Pickford, Kenyan-born paleoanthropologist
 Mary Pickford, Canadian-American actress
 Mary Ada Pickford, British politician, industrialist and historian
 Olive Thomas Pickford, American actress
 Terry Pickford, Canadian-American TV writer, producer and editor
 Thomas Pickford, convicted of murdering Jody Dobrowski in South London in 2005
 William Pickford, 1st Baron Sterndale, British lawyer and judge
 William Pickford (1861–1938), English football administrator,

See also
 Pickfords, British-based moving company
 Pickfair
 Pickford Township, Michigan
 Pickford's House Museum, Derby, England
 Pickford Center for Motion Picture Study, Hollywood, California
 Pickford: The Woman Who Made Hollywood,  1997 biography of actress Mary Pickford